Stephen Alexander Mardenborough (born 11 September 1964) is an English former professional footballer who made more than 300 appearances in the Football League.

Career
A much travelled player during his career, Mardenborough's first club was Coventry City but was released after finishing his apprenticeship, joining Wolverhampton Wanderers. He struggled to make an impact on the first team. His only league goal for the club was the winner at Anfield in January 1984 against reigning champions Liverpool, who were en route to another League title as well as the 1983–84 European Cup, while Wolves would be relegated. After a loan spell at Cambridge United, Mardenborough joined Swansea City in July 1984. He was a popular figure in his single season at the club but was allowed to leave in a mass clear-out of players at the end of the year, staying in Wales to sign for Newport County.

After two seasons in Newport he joined his third Welsh club in Cardiff City. He struggled to reproduce the same form he had previously shown, scoring just once in a 3–1 win over Torquay United, and was allowed to join Hereford United after one season. After leaving Hereford he spent time playing in Sweden for IFK Östersund before returning to England with Cheltenham Town. In 1990 he signed for Darlington where he held a regular first team place for several years, playing over 100 times for the club and helping them gain promotion back into the Football League.

Leaving Darlington in 1993, he spent one year at Lincoln City before having a short spell at Colchester United and non-contract terms at Scarborough and Swansea. His second spell at Swansea would be his last in the Football League before dropping into non-league, playing in the Welsh Premier League for nearly ten years.

Personal life
Mardenborough's son Jann Mardenborough became a professional racing driver after winning the 2011 GT Academy on the Gran Turismo series of PlayStation driving games.

Honours

Club
Cardiff City
 Football League Fourth Division winner: 1987–88

Darlington
 Football Conference winner: 1989–90
 Football League Fourth Division winner: 1990–91

References
General
 
 

Specific

External links
 

1964 births
Living people
Footballers from Birmingham, West Midlands
Association football midfielders
English footballers
Coventry City F.C. players
Wolverhampton Wanderers F.C. players
Cambridge United F.C. players
Swansea City A.F.C. players
Newport County A.F.C. players
Cardiff City F.C. players
Hereford United F.C. players
Östersunds FK players
Cheltenham Town F.C. players
Darlington F.C. players
Lincoln City F.C. players
Scarborough F.C. players
Stafford Rangers F.C. players
Colchester United F.C. players
Cwmbrân Town A.F.C. players
Cardiff Metropolitan University F.C. players
Aberystwyth Town F.C. players
Rhayader Town F.C. players
Haverfordwest County A.F.C. players
Port Talbot Town F.C. players
Llanelli Town A.F.C. players
Gloucester City A.F.C. players
Carmarthen Town A.F.C. players
Barry Town United F.C. players
English Football League players
Cymru Premier players
IFK Östersund players
English expatriate footballers
Expatriate footballers in Sweden
English expatriate sportspeople in Sweden